Sophia Ralli (born 4 March 1988 in Naousa) is an alpine skier from Greece. She competed for Greece at the 2010 Winter Olympics. Her best result was 47th place in the slalom.

References

External links
 
 

1988 births
Living people
Greek female alpine skiers
Alpine skiers at the 2010 Winter Olympics
Alpine skiers at the 2014 Winter Olympics
Olympic alpine skiers of Greece
Alpine skiers at the 2018 Winter Olympics
Sportspeople from Naousa, Imathia